Ronny Teuber (born 1 September 1965) is a German former footballer and former member of the East Germany national football team as well as the East Germany national under-21 football team.

Career
The East Berlin-born goalkeeper played over 100 matches in the East German top-flight. His one cap for East Germany came in 1990.

Teuber worked as a goalkeeping coach for Bundesliga side Hamburger SV and assisting coach for Borussia Dortmund. On 12 December 2016, he was announced as the new manager of Swiss second division club FC Wil.

References

External links
 
 
 

1965 births
Living people
German footballers
Association football goalkeepers
East German footballers
East Germany international footballers
East Germany under-21 international footballers
1. FC Union Berlin players
FC Hansa Rostock players
Dynamo Dresden players
Borussia Dortmund players
Borussia Dortmund II players
SpVgg Greuther Fürth players
1. FC Köln players
DDR-Oberliga players
People from East Berlin
Footballers from Berlin
Hamburger SV non-playing staff
Borussia Dortmund non-playing staff
FC Wil managers
Eintracht Braunschweig non-playing staff
Expatriate football managers in Switzerland
German expatriate sportspeople in Switzerland
Association football goalkeeping coaches
German football managers